Dara Entekhabi is the Bacardi and Stockholm Water Foundations Professor in the Department of Civil and Environmental Engineering and the Department of Earth, Atmospheric and Planetary Sciences at Massachusetts Institute of Technology. His research spans a variety of topics in hydrology, including land-atmosphere interactions, surface water - groundwater interactions, data assimilation, and remote sensing.

In 2015, he was named Fellow of the Institute of Electrical and Electronics Engineers (IEEE) for contributions to microwave remote sensing of soil moisture. In 2017, he was elected as a member of National Academy of Engineering for leadership in the hydrologic sciences including the scientific underpinnings for satellite observation of the Earth's water cycle.

Awards
Presidential Young Investigator Award, National Science Foundation (NSF), 1991
Lettere ed Arti, Cav. Arturo Parisatti Prize, Istituto Veneto di Scienze, 1994
James B. Macelwane Medal, American Geophysical Union (AGU), 1996
Fellow, American Geophysical Union (AGU), 1996
Fellow, American Meteorological Society (AMS), 2003
Robert E. Horton Lecture, American Meteorological Society, 2012
Boussinesq Lecture, Boussinesq Center for Hydrology, The Netherlands, 2014
Fellow, Institute of Electrical and Electronics Engineers (IEEE), 2015
Hydrologic Sciences Award, American Geophysical Union, 2015
Hydrology Days Award, CSU and AGU, 2016
Eagleson Lecture, Consortium Universities for Advancement of Hydrologic Science, 2016
Member, National Academy of Engineering (NAE), 2017
Dave & Lucille Atlas Remote Sensing Prize, American Meteorological Society, 2017
NASA Group Achievement Award (Soil Moisture Active Passive Mission), 2017
NASA Outstanding Public Leadership Medal, 2017

Leadership
Science Team Leader, Soil Moisture Active Passive (SMAP) mission, NASA, Phase E,  January 31, 2015 launch.
Science Team Member, Airborne Microwave Observatory of Subcanopy and Subsurface (AirMOSS), NASA, Phase E, 2012-2018.
International Science Team Member, Water Cycle Observation Mission (WCOM), China Academy of Science, Phase A, 2017 Launch.
Principal Investigator, The Hydrosphere State satellite mission (HYDROS), NASA Earth System Science Pathfinder program, 2000-2005.

References 

Members of the United States National Academy of Engineering
Fellow Members of the IEEE
Fellows of the American Geophysical Union
American people of Iranian descent
Living people
Year of birth missing (living people)